The Brownville Bridge is a truss bridge over the Missouri River on U.S. Route 136 (US 136) from Nemaha County, Nebraska, to Atchison County, Missouri, at Brownville, Nebraska.

It was built in 1939 by Atchison County, at a cost of $700,000 and was originally run as a toll bridge. The structure was designed by HNTB.  Bethlehem Steel Co. built the superstructure, while C.F. Lytle Co. built the  substructure and C.W. Atkinson Paving Co. completed the approaches.  It has since been converted from a toll bridge to become a free crossing maintained by the Missouri Department of Transportation.

The bridge is extremely narrow, with no shoulders and only one 8-foot lane in each direction and a total deck width of 22.6 ft.  A cantilevered Warren through truss, the bridge's longest span is 419.8 ft.  The total length is 1,903.3 ft.

The bridge underwent extensive repairs in 2009–10. The deck was replaced, along with pier and steel structure repair.

It was listed on the National Register of Historic Places in 1993.  The bridge was closed to all traffic for 216 consecutive days from March 2019 to October 2019 as a result of the 2019 Midwestern U.S. floods' damage to the approaches.

See also

 List of crossings of the Missouri River
 List of historic bridges in Nebraska
 List of bridges on the National Register of Historic Places in Nebraska
 List of bridges on the National Register of Historic Places in Missouri
 National Register of Historic Places listings in Nemaha County, Nebraska
 National Register of Historic Places listings in Atchison County, Missouri

References

External links

Visit Nemaha County

National Register of Historic Places entry

Truss bridges in the United States
Buildings and structures in Atchison County, Missouri
Buildings and structures in Nemaha County, Nebraska
Road bridges on the National Register of Historic Places in Nebraska
U.S. Route 136
Bridges completed in 1939
Road bridges on the National Register of Historic Places in Missouri
Bridges of the United States Numbered Highway System
Bridges over the Missouri River
Former toll bridges in Missouri
Former toll bridges in Nebraska
National Register of Historic Places in Atchison County, Missouri
National Register of Historic Places in Nemaha County, Nebraska
Steel bridges in the United States
Interstate vehicle bridges in the United States